Hospital of Southern Norway is the trust which runs the hospitals in the counties of Aust-Agder and Vest-Agder. The general hospitals in the Agder counties were joined together under one trust by the state, with Helse Sør-Øst as owner.

The trust is organised into six clinics, which have medical specialities independent of their geographical placement. The five clinics are:
 Medical clinic
 Surgical clinic
 Clinic for psychiatric health - psychiatry and dependency behaviour
 Medical service clinic (related functions)
 Clinic for radiology
 Rehabilitation unit

Hospital of Southern Norway has large centres at Arendal, Kristiansand, and Flekkefjord. There are also smaller centres at Risør, Grimstad, Mandal and Farsund. In addition, there are small psychiatric drop-ins in many of the smaller municipalities, often with responsibility for patients from neighbouring municipalities.

In 2004, the hospital took responsibility for alcoholism treatment in the Agder counties, and this came under the psychiatric and psychological treatment in Arendal and Kristiansand.

Before the health reforms
Prior to the state taking control of the hospitals on 1 February 2003, the hospital functions were dealt with by the municipality. Within the trust of Hospital of Southern Norway, there are the following hospitals:

 Aust-Agder Central Hospital Arendal, ASA (now: Sørlandet Hospital Arendal)
 Vest-Agder Central Hospital (now: Sørlandet Hospital Kristiansand)
 Eg Hospital (now: Psychiatric Hospital (PSA), Kristiansand)
 Farsund Hospital (now: Disbanded and sold to Farsund municipality)
 Flekkefjord Hospital (now: Sørlandet Hospital Flekkefjord)
 Mandal Hospital (now: Sørlandet Hospital Mandal)

References

External links
 Hospital of Southern Norway 
 Departments and visiting addresses 
 Annual report 2006

Arendal
Flekkefjord
Kristiansand
Health trusts of Norway